Yusuf Mersin (born 23 September 1994) is a Turkish professional footballer who plays for Maidstone United as a goalkeeper.

Club career
Born in London, Mersin moved from Millwall to Liverpool in January 2011. He signed for Kasımpaşa in August 2014, before returning to England with Crawley Town in June 2016. He was offered a new contract by Crawley at the end of the 2017–18 season. On 9 May 2019, Mersin was released by Crawley after making 19 appearances for the club.

Dover Athletic
On 20 May 2019, Mersin joined National League side Dover Athletic on a two-year contract. He made his debut for the club on 19 October in the FA Cup 4th qualifying round, a 2–1 victory over National League South side Weymouth and made his league debut the following week in a 1–0 defeat to Stockport County, being caught out from 45 yards for the only goal of the match. Following the arrival of Charlton Athletic loanee Ashley Maynard-Brewer, in February 2020 Mersin was placed on the transfer list by Dover. Following's Dover's decision to not play any more matches in the 2020–21 season, made in late January, and subsequent null and voiding of all results, on 5 May 2021 it was announced that Mersin was out of contract and had left the club.

He signed for Maidstone United in November 2021, making his debut as a substitute in February 2022 after first-choice goalkeeper Tom Hadler was sent off.

International career
He has represented Turkey at under-17 and under-18 youth international levels.

Career statistics

References

1994 births
Living people
Footballers from Greenwich
Turkish footballers
Turkey youth international footballers
English footballers
English people of Turkish descent
Millwall F.C. players
Liverpool F.C. players
Kasımpaşa S.K. footballers
Crawley Town F.C. players
Dover Athletic F.C. players
Maidstone United F.C. players
English Football League players
National League (English football) players
Association football goalkeepers
English expatriate footballers